The 22927 / 22928 Lok Shakti Express is an Express train belonging to Indian Railways that runs between Bandra Terminus & Ahmedabad in India. It is a daily service.

It operates as train number 22927 from Bandra Terminus to Ahmedabad and as train number 22928 in the reverse direction. The name Lok Shakti means People's Power.

Coaches

The Lok Shakti Express has 1 AC 1st Class cum AC 2 tier, 1 AC 2 tier, 4 AC 3 tier, 12 Sleeper class, 3 General Unreserved, 2 Seating cum Luggage Rake coaches. As with most train services in India, Coach Composition may be amended at the discretion of Indian Railways depending on demand.

Service

The Lok Shakti Express is a daily train service & covers the distance of 481 kilometres in 7 hours 40 mins in both direction (65.58 km/hr).

Traction

Dual traction WCAM 1 locos would haul the train all the way between Bandra Terminus & Ahmedabad.

After Western Railway switched over to AC system in February 2012, it is hauled by a WAP-4E or WAP-5 locomotive from the Vadodara electric loco shed.

Routing

The 22927 / 22928 Lok Shakti Express runs from Bandra Terminus via Borivali, Virar, Palghar, Vapi, Surat, Vadodara Junction to Ahmedabad Junction and vice versa.

Rake Sharing

The train shares its rake with 19031/19032 Ahmedabad - Haridwar Yoga Express.

Gallery

External links
Lok Shakti Express

Named passenger trains of India
Mumbai–Ahmedabad trains
Express trains in India